The Taean Line is an electrified standard-gauge secondary line of the Korean State Railway in Namp'o-t'ŭkpyŏlsi, North Korea, running from Kangsŏ in Kangsŏ-guyŏk on the P'yŏngnam Line to Taean Freight Station in Taean-guyŏk.

History
The Taean Line was originally built during the Japanese occupation of Korea by the Chosen Government Railway. After the defeat of Japan in the Pacific War and the subsequent partition of Korea, the entirety of the line, being north of the 38th parallel, was located in the Soviet zone of occupation; on 10 August 1946, the Provisional People's Committee for North Korea nationalised all railways within its jurisdiction, including the Taean Line, and it has since been operated by the Korean State Railway.

Services
All freight heading to and from the Taean Machine Complex located in Taean moves via this line. Steel arrives there from the Kimch'aek Iron & Steel Complex, the Hwanghae Iron & Steel Complex and the Ch'ŏllima Steel Complex, nonferrous metals from the Munp'yŏng Smelter, and imported materials and parts unloaded from ships at Namp'o Port. Also served by rail here are the Taean Electric Factory, and the Taean Friendship Glass Factory.

Route
A yellow background in the "Distance" box indicates that section of the line is not electrified.

References

Railway lines in North Korea
Standard gauge railways in North Korea